The Porsche 968 is a sports car manufactured by German automobile manufacturer Porsche AG from 1991 until 1995. It was the final evolution of a series of water-cooled front-engine rear wheel drive models begun almost 20 years earlier with the 924, taking over the entry-level position in the company lineup from the 944 with which it shared about 20% of its parts. The 968 was Porsche's last new front-engined vehicle before the introduction of the Cayenne SUV in 2003.

History 
Porsche's 944 model debuted for the 1982 model year as an evolution of the 924, was updated as "944S" in 1987 and as "944S2" in 1989. Porsche was in significant financial crisis at the time with less interest in its sports cars from customers, especially in the US. The virtually unchanged design of the 944, which was derived from the 924, was showing its age and sales of the model declined. Porsche hence found the need to develop a new entry level model. Shortly after the start of production of the S2 variant, Porsche engineers began working on another set of significant upgrades for the model, as executives were planning a final "S3" variant of the 944 with a design language in line with the models in its lineup in order to save development costs. During the development phase, 80% of the 944's mechanical components were either significantly modified or completely replaced by the engineers, leaving so little of the outgoing S2 model that Porsche management chose to introduce the variant as a new model, calling it the 968. In addition to the numerous mechanical upgrades, the new model also received significantly evolved styling both inside and out, with a more modern, streamlined look and more standard luxury amenities than on the 944. To save production costs, production was moved from the Audi plant in Neckarsulm (where the 924 and 944 had been manufactured under contract to Porsche), to Porsche's own factory in Zuffenhausen.

Design 

The 968 was mainly a restyled evolution of the 944 with design links visible to its predecessor. Design work was done by Harm Lagaay who had designed the 924 and the 944 as well. The front of the car largely resembled the top-of-the line 928, sharing its exposed pop-up headlamps and the integrated front bumper. This frontal design would eventually appear on the 911 (993) two years later. 

The rear of the 968 was also redesigned, featuring fully coloured rounded taillamps. Special bulbs were used in the taillamps which either illuminated a small area in amber colour when the turn signals were activated or in white when the car was reversing. PORSCHE badging was fitted between the taillights just below the model type number. The rear apron was integrated into the smoothened rear bumper.

While the exterior of the car was rounded and smoothed, the interior was largely unchanged and mostly shared with the preceding 944 S2 with the exception of switches and control knobs. The 968 also featured numerous small equipment and detail upgrades from the 944, including a Fuba roof-mounted antenna, updated single lens tail lamps, "Cup" style 16-inch alloy wheels, a wider selection of interior and exterior colours, a slightly updated "B" pillar and rear quarter window to accommodate adhesive installation to replace the older rubber gasket installation.

Models

968

Like its predecessor, the 968 was offered in coupé and convertible bodystyles. Modifications to the engine include a higher 11.0:1 compression ratio, lighter crankshaft, crankcase and pistons along with revised intake valves and intake manifold. Changes to the 968's powertrain also included the addition of Porsche's then-new VarioCam variable valve timing system, newly optimized induction and exhaust systems, a dual-mass flywheel, and updated engine management electronics. The 968's engine was the fourth-largest four-cylinder engine ever offered in a production car at that time. A new 6-speed manual transmission replaced the 944's old 5-speed, and Porsche's dual-mode 4-speed Tiptronic automatic became an available option. Both the VarioCam timing system and Tiptronic transmission were very recent developments for Porsche. The Tiptronic transmission had debuted for the first time only 3 years prior to the debut of the 968, on the 1989 Type 964 911. The VarioCam timing system was first introduced on the 968 and would later become a feature of the Type 993 air-cooled six-cylinder engine.

Much of the 968's chassis was carried over from the 944 S2, which in itself shared many components with the 944 Turbo (internally numbered 951) due to lack of development funds at the time. Borrowed components include the Brembo-sourced four-piston brake calipers on all four wheels with ventilated brake rotors, ABS,  aluminium semi-trailing arms and aluminum front A-arms, used in a Macpherson strut arrangement. The steel unibody structure was also very similar to that of the previous models. Porsche maintained that 80% of the car was new.

The 968 can attain a top speed of  when equipped with the manual transmission and has a 0– acceleration time of 6.5 seconds.

For the 1993 model year, the 968 received minor changes which included a pollen filter to increase the cleanliness of the air being channeled through the air conditioner and the introduction of special packages. The seat package included heated driver and front passenger seats, the sound package included an additional amplifier in the coupé and two additional speakers installed at the rear in the convertible while the suspension package included larger 17 inch wheels and an improved braking system with cross-drilled brake discs.

968 CS (Club Sport) 

From October 1992 through 1995, Porsche offered a lighter-weight "Club Sport" version of the 968 designed for enthusiasts seeking increased track performance. Much of the 968's luxury-oriented equipment was removed or taken off the options list; less sound deadening material was used, power windows were replaced with crank-driven units, upgraded stereo systems, A/C and sunroof were still optional as on the standard coupé and Convertible models. In addition, Porsche installed manually adjustable lightweight Recaro racing seats rather than the standard power-operated leather buckets (also manufactured by Recaro), a revised suspension system optimised and lowered by 20 mm for possible track use, 17-inch wheels (also slightly wider to accommodate wider tyres) rather than the 16-inch as found on the coupé and wider tyres, 225 front and 255 rear rather than 205 and 225 respectively. The four-spoke airbag steering wheel was replaced with a thicker-rimmed three-spoke sports steering wheel with no airbag, heated washer jets were replaced with non heated, vanity covers in the engine bay were deleted, as was the rear wiper. The Club Sport has no rear seats, unlike the 2+2 Coupé.

Model year 1993 Club Sport models were only available in Grand Prix White, black, Speed yellow, Guards red or Maritime blue exterior colours. Seat backs were colour-coded to the body. "Club Sport" decals were applied to UK market cars in either black, red or white but there was a 'delete' option.

For model year 1994, Riviera blue replaced Maritime Blue and a number of other colours and option packs were available including the option to add comfort rear seats with an electric boot release.

All Club Sports had black interiors with simpler door cards similar to the 944. Due to the reduction in the number of electrical items the wiring loom was reduced in complexity which saved weight and also the battery was replaced with a smaller one, again reducing weight. With the no frills approach meaning less weight, as well as the optimising of the suspension, Porsche could focus media attention on the Club Sport variants fast road and track abilities. This helped to slightly bolster the flagging sales figures in the mid-1990s. The Club Sport variant achieved a 'Performance Car Of The Year' award in 1993 from Performance Car magazine in the UK. Club Sport models were only officially available in the UK, Europe, Japan & Australia, although "grey market" cars found their way elsewhere.

A UK-only version called "968 Sport", was offered in 1994 and 1995, and was essentially a Club Sport model (it uses CS chassis numbers) with various model year 1994 option packs to create the P35 "CS UK Luxury Pack". This added an alarm, power windows / mirrors, electric release boot, central locking, sunroof and cloth comfort front and rear seats (the same front seats were a non cost option on the CS). With the added electrics the larger wiring loom was used. At £32,995, the 968 Sport was priced £4,500 lower than the standard 968, but had most of the latter's desirable "luxuries" and consequently outsold it by a large margin (306 of the 968 Sport models compared to 40 standard 968 coupés).

968 Turbo S 
In 1993, Porsche Motorsports at Weissach briefly produced a turbocharged 968 Turbo S, a fairly odd naming choice for Porsche which usually reserves the added "S" moniker for models that have been tuned for more power over a "lesser" counterpart, such as with the 911 Turbo. The 968 Turbo S shared the same body and interior as the Club Sport and visually can be identified by the NACA bonnet hood scoops, adjustable rear wing, three-piece speedline wheels and deeper front spoiler. The 968 Turbo S was powered by a 3.0 L engine with an 8-valve SOHC cylinder head (from the 944 Turbo S) and 944S2 style engine block. Only 14 were produced in total and only for sale in mainland Europe.

Motorsport

968 Turbo RS 

Between 1992 and 1994, Porsche Motorsports Research and Development built and provided a full "Race" version (stripped out 968 Turbo S) for Porsche's customer race teams. The interior of the Turbo RS features a single racing bucket seat with six point harness along with a welded in roll cage required for it to be eligible. Other modifications included a modified 6-speed manual transmission having altered gear ratios and a racing clutch along with racing suspension. Only 4 were ever produced as privateer racing teams showed much interest in the 911 Carrera RS 3.8 race car offered at the same time. These are the rarest 968s ever produced.

In the ADAC GT Cup, the Joest team achieved fourth place in the Avus race in 1993 with the Turbo RS driven by Manuel Reuter. In the BPR, the car was driven at the 4-hour race by Dijon in 1994 to sixth place which was its best result in the race series. The Seikel Motorsport team used a 968 Turbo RS at the 1994 24 Hours of Le Mans, driven by John Nielsen, Thomas Bscher and Lindsay Owen-Jones. After 84 laps, the team had to end the race prematurely after an accident.

Production figures for all 968 variants 

The 968 was Porsche's last front-engine vehicle of any type before the introduction of the Cayenne SUV in 2003. Its discontinuation in 1995 due to poor sales coincided with that of the 928, Porsche's only other front-engine car at the time. The 968 was also the last Porsche sold with a four-cylinder engine prior to the introduction of the Porsche Macan in 2014.

While lacking the wider ranging appeal of the 911, the 968 developed its own following. This is likely due to the 968's unique combination of speed and practicality, and low production numbers.

References

Notes

Bibliography

External links 

968Forums Resource website and forum in the US
968.net, the Porsche 968 online community
968uk.com Porsche 968 online resource and forum based in the UK
 

968
Sports cars
Rear-wheel-drive vehicles
Cars introduced in 1991
Cars discontinued in 1995